Phlox condensata is a species of phlox known by the common name dwarf phlox. It is native to the western United States including eastern California, Nevada, and Colorado, where it grows in rocky, mountainous areas. It is a very compact mat-forming perennial herb growing in patches often less than a centimeter tall. The toothlike lance-shaped leaves are no more than half a centimeter long and lined with stiff hairs. The inflorescence is a solitary tubular flower up to a centimeter long with a flat white or pale pink corolla.

External links

Jepson Manual Treatment
Photo gallery

condensata
Flora of North America